Johan "Jan" Blankers (23 April 1904 – 17 July 1977) was a Dutch athlete and coach. He competed in the triple jump at the 1928 Olympics, but failed to reach the final. He won the national title in this event in 1931 and 1932, but later tore an Achilles tendon, which resulted in his retirement and in a slight limping for the rest of his life.

In September 1935 Blankers met Fanny Blankers-Koen at an athletic competition. He was impressed by her talent, but also noticed faults in her running technique. He eventually became her coach and married her on 29 August 1940. They had a son Jan (born 20 August 1941) and a daughter Fanny (born 12 February 1946).

In 1935, Blankers also became a national athletics coach and prepared the Dutch team to the 1936 Olympics. Soon after he founded a woman's athletics association Sagitta in Amsterdam to promote sports among women. Within a few years Sagitta became the leading woman's athletics club in the Netherlands. At the 1938 European Athletics Championships its members Fanny Blankers-Koen and Nelly van Balen-Blanken won three medals in the sprint and high jump.

Blankers continued working as a coach with the national team and Sagitta through World War II and 1940–50s. Besides his wife, his students included Tilly van der Zwaard, Loes Boling and Els van Noorduyn. He spent much of his later life involved with sports journalism.

References

1904 births
1977 deaths
Dutch athletics coaches
Dutch sports journalists
Dutch male triple jumpers
Athletes (track and field) at the 1928 Summer Olympics
Olympic athletes of the Netherlands
Athletes from Amsterdam
20th-century Dutch people